There are at least 85 named lakes and reservoirs in White County, Arkansas.

Lakes
Arm Lake, el.  
Bacon Lake, el.  
Bailey Lake, el.  
Ball Lake, el.  
Barbers Lake, el.  
Bear Water Slough, el.  
Beaver Lake, el.  
Beaver Pond, el.  
Beaver Pond, el.  
Big Bell Lake, el.  
Big Brushy Lake, el.  
Big Clear Lake, el.  
Big Green Tom Lake, el.  
Big Hurricane Lake, el.  
Birch Pond, el.  
Blue Hole Lake, el.  
Bollie Pond, el.  
Bradford Lake, el.  
Britt Lake, el.  
Brushy Lake, el.  
Cheek Lake, el.  
Cobb Lake, el.  
Cunningham Pond, el.  
Cypress Lake, el.  
Diamond Pond, el.  
Dollar Pond, el.  
Doniphan Lake, el.  
Goose Pond, el.  
Grinnell Pond, el.  
Gum Pond, el.  
Hackelton Lake, el.  
Hat Lake, el.  
Honey Lake, el.  
Hopspinike Lake, el.  
Horseshoe Lake, el.  
Jarvers Lake, el.  
Kellum Slough, el.  
Little Bell Lake, el.  
Little Brushy Lake, el.  
Little Clear Lake, el.  
Little Green Tom Lake, el.  
Little Green Tom Lake, el.  
Little Hurricane Lake, el.  
Little Lake, el.  
Long Lake, el.  
Mallard Pond, el.  
McDougal Lake, el.  
Mica Lake, el.  
Milliken Lake, el.  
Moon Lake, el.  
Mud Pond, el.  
 Murphy Lake, el.  
 Newmann Lake, el.  
 Otter Pond, el.  
 Otto Lake, el.  
 Redman Lake, el.  
 Round Pond, el.  
 Ryan Lake, el.  
 Smith Pond, el.  
 Swan Ponds, el.  
 Three Sisters Lake, el.  
 Walker Lake, el.  
 Wheaton Lake, el.  
 Whirl Lake, el.  
 Willow Pond, el.  
 Wolf Lake, el.

Reservoirs
Bridges Lake, el.  
Buddy Lake, el.  
Chavell Lake Two, el.  
Hill Lake, el.  
Jenkins Lake, el.  
Kinley Lake, el.  
Lake Bald Knob, el.  
Lercher Lake Number One, el.  
Lercher Lake Number Two, el.  
Myers Lake, el.  
Ranson Lake, el.  
Schroeder Lake, el.  
Smith Lake, el.  
Smith Lake One, el.  
Smith Lake Two, el.  
 Stewart's Reservoir, el.  
Troutman Lake, el.  
Wingert Reservoir, el.  
Wyldewood Lake, el.

See also
 List of lakes in Arkansas

Notes

Bodies of water of White County, Arkansas
White